Fernando del Paso Morante  (April 1, 1935 – November 14, 2018) was a Mexican novelist, essayist and poet.

Biography
Del Paso was born in Mexico City and took two years in economics at the National Autonomous University of Mexico (UNAM). He lived in London for 14 years, where he worked for the British Broadcasting Corporation and in France, where he worked for Radio France Internationale and briefly served as Consul General of Mexico.

He has been a member of El Colegio Nacional de México since 1996 and  won several international awards, including the Premio Miguel de Cervantes (2015), Alfonso Reyes International Prize (2013), the FIL Literature Prize  (2007) Guadalajara International Book Fair), the Rómulo Gallegos Prize (1982), the Best Novel Published in France Award (1985) for Palinurus of Mexico, the Xavier Villaurrutia Award (1966) and the Mexico Novel Award (1976).

Noticias del Imperio (1986) is an important contribution to the Latin American new historical novel. The novel, based upon the lives of Maximilian and Carlota and the French Intervention in Mexico, is called by the author a "historiographic" novel.  This encyclopedic novel is remarkable in that, instead of trying to discover the "truth" about "what really happened," the author presents a number of possible versions of important and controversial events.

Library and Media Center
On May 14, 2007, the Universidad de Guadalajara  paid homage to Fernando del Paso by naming the library and media center in Ocotlán, Jalisco, the "Biblioteca Fernando del Paso". This library is the largest in the western region of Mexico with a collection of 120,000 volumes and a capacity for 800 simultaneous users.

Awards
 Xavier Villaurrutia Award, 1966
 Rómulo Gallegos Prize, 1982
 FIL Literature Prize, 2007
 Alfonso Reyes International Prize, 2013
 Miguel de Cervantes Prize, 2015

Selected works
Sonetos del amor y de lo diario (poetry, 1958)
José Trigo (novel, 1966)
Palinuro de México (1976; translated as Palinuro of Mexico, 1989)
Noticias del Imperio (novel, 1986; translated as News from the Empire, 2009)
Douceur & passion cuisine mexicaine  (París, 1991)
Linda 67: Historia de un crimen (novel, 1995)

External links
Fernando del Paso (El Colegio Nacional)
 Fernando del Paso Library and Media Center

References

1935 births
2018 deaths
BBC people
International Writing Program alumni
Male novelists
Members of El Colegio Nacional (Mexico)
Mexican male writers
Mexican novelists
National Autonomous University of Mexico alumni
People from Mexico City
Radio France people
Premio Cervantes winners